Volodymyr Holovaty is a retired Soviet and Ukrainian football player.

Career
Volodymyr Holovaty, started his career in 1985 at Spartak Ivano-Frankivsk until 1995, where he played 130 games. In 1995 he moved to Kalush. After a short break in his career, he returned to the team in 1989, and then in 1992, after the collapse of the USSR. In the first league of Ukraine, Golovaty spent two seasons and at the end of the 1993/94 season entered the elite division with the team. The following season, he played 13 games in the Major League and scored a goal against Volyn Lutsk. However, in the course of the season, the player left the team and moved to the amateur Kremin Kremenchuk. In the 1995/96 and 1996/97 seasons he played for Kalush in Ukrainian Second League. In 1997 he signed a contract with  Desna Chernihiv the club of Chernihiv in Ukrainian First League and spent one and a half seasons with it. Later he played for other clubs of the first and second league "Flint", Kalush, Enerhetyk Burshtyn and Naftovyk Dolyna. In 2000, returning to Kalush, he was also the head coach of the team. In 2004, after the end of his playing career, he headed the amateur club "Tuzhilov".

Honours
Spartak Ivano-Frankivsk
 Ukrainian First League: 1993–94

References

External links 
 Volodymyr Holovaty allplayers.in.ua

1968 births
Living people
Soviet footballers
Ukrainian footballers
FC Desna Chernihiv players
FC Spartak Ivano-Frankivsk players
FC Kalush players
FC Slavutych players
FC Kremin Kremenchuk players
FC Enerhetyk Burshtyn players
FC Naftovyk Dolyna players
Ukrainian First League players
Ukrainian Premier League players
Association football midfielders